Michel Noël, born Jean-Noel Croteau (June 27 1922 – June 22 1993) was a Quebecois actor most famous for his character of Capitaine Bonhomme. This literary character was adapted into a children's TV show, Le Cirque du Capitaine (1970-1973), which was also adapted into a comic strip by Gui Laflamme.

He appeared in many TV series, and also recorded and sold records.

Filmography 
 1954–1957 : L'Île aux trésors (TV series) : Capitaine Hublot
 1957 : Elise Velder (TV series)
 1957–1961 : La Pension Velder (TV series) : Philidor Papineau 
 1959 : L'Héritage
 1963 : Le Zoo du Capitaine Bonhomme (TV series) : Capitaine Bonhomme
 1968 : Capitaine Bonhomme (TV series) : Capitaine Bonhomme
 1969–1974 : Quelle famille! (TV series) : Grand-père
 1970 : Le cirque du Capitaine (TV series) : Capitaine Bonhomme
 1975 : Don't Push It (Pousse mais pousse égal)
 1976 : Chère Isabelle (TV series)
 1976–1977: Pour tout l'monde (TV series): Capitaine Bonhomme
 1992 : Coup de chance (TV)

Sources

References
Artisan Emissions

External link

Male actors from Quebec
1922 births
1993 deaths
20th-century Canadian male actors
20th-century Canadian novelists